Ciliopagurus macrolepis is a species of hermit crab native to Indonesia.

References

Hermit crabs
Crustaceans described in 1995